"Famous" is a song by English singer Nathan Sykes. The song was released in the United Kingdom on 30 September 2016 as the fourth single from his debut studio album Unfinished Business (2016). The song peaked at number 28 on the UK Singles Chart. The song was written by Nathan Sykes, Harmony Samuels, Major Johnson Finley, Carmen Reece and Edgar "JV" Etienne.

Background
Sykes told MTV that he wrote an emotional but very nice song about his breakup with fellow singer Ariana Grande. In another interview, Sykes admitted that he cried while writing the song.

Music video
A music video to accompany the release of "Famous" was first released onto YouTube on 17 October 2016.

Track listing

Chart performance

Weekly charts

Release history

References

2016 singles
2015 songs
Nathan Sykes songs
Songs written by Nathan Sykes
Songs written by Harmony Samuels
Songs written by Carmen Reece
Pop ballads
Soul ballads
2010s ballads
Song recordings produced by Harmony Samuels